Cheirodendron platyphyllum, also known as lapalapa, is a species of flowering plant in the ginseng family, Araliaceae, that is endemic to the islands of Oahu and Kauai in Hawaii.

References

External links

Araliaceae
Endemic flora of Hawaii
Trees of Hawaii
Flora without expected TNC conservation status